Kharkhüügiin Enkh-Amar (born 5 August 1992) is a Mongolian boxer. He competed in the men's flyweight event at the 2016 Summer Olympics.

References

External links
 

1992 births
Living people
People from Khovd Province
Mongolian male boxers
Boxers at the 2016 Summer Olympics
Olympic boxers of Mongolia
Universiade medalists in boxing
Boxers at the 2018 Asian Games
Universiade gold medalists for Mongolia
Asian Games competitors for Mongolia
Flyweight boxers
Medalists at the 2013 Summer Universiade
20th-century Mongolian people
21st-century Mongolian people